This is a list of Arctic exploration vessels:

USS Advance (1850)
Airship Italia
Akademik Fyodorov
Akademik Tryoshnikov
HMS Alert (1856)
America (airship)
Antarctic Snow Cruiser
HMS Assistance (1850)
USS Bear (1874)
HMS Blossom (1806)
Bowdoin (Arctic schooner)
SS Chelyuskin
USRC Thomas Corwin (1876)
HMS Discovery (1874)
Effie M. Morrissey
HMS Enterprise (1848)
HMS Erebus (1826)
Fox (ship)
Fram (ship)
HMS Fury (1814)
Icebreaker Fyodor Litke
HMS Griper (1813)
USCGC Healy (WAGB-20)
HMS Hecla (1815)
HMS Investigator (1848)
USS Jeannette (1878)
Icebreaker Joseph Stalin
Karluk (ship)
King & Winge (fishing schooner)
MIR (submersible)
USS Nautilus (SSN-571)
Norge (airship)
Steamer Pravda
HMS Resolute (1850)
USS Rodgers (1879)
USS Sargo (SSN-583)
USS Seadragon (SSN-584)
Icebreaker Sedov
Sibiryakov (1909 icebreaker)
USS Skate (SSN-578)
HMS Terror (1813)
Steamer Tovarishch Stalin
USS Rescue (1850)
Steamer Volodarskiy
USS Whale (SSN-638)

 
Arctic
Exploration vessels